Slobodan Kovačevski was The Mayor of Kumanovo Municipality in Macedonia from 2000 to 2005. He was Macedonian Ambassador in Montenegro from 2006 to 2010.

References

External links

Mayors of Kumanovo
Ambassadors of North Macedonia to Montenegro
Living people
Year of birth missing (living people)